The 2016–17 season of the Regionalliga was the 58th season of the third-tier football league in Austria, since its establishment in 1959.

Regionalliga Ost

Regionalliga Mitte

Regionalliga West

Direct promotion
No team from the Regionalliga West or Ost applied for promotion, therefore the promotion play-offs were cancelled. Instead, only one team, the Regionalliga Mitte champion, was promoted to the Austrian Football First League.

Relegation play-offs
In relegation play-offs for the Regionalliga Ost, SKN St. Pölten II, as the worst placed second team in the East, had to compete against SV Mattersburg II since only four amateur teams are allowed in the regional league.'

|}

Top scorers

References

External links
 Regionalliga Ost  
 Regionalliga Mitte  
 Regionalliga West  

Austrian Regionalliga seasons
Austrian Regional League
3